The 2014 United States House of Representatives elections were held on November 4, 2014, with early voting taking place in some states in the weeks preceding that date. Voters chose representatives from all 435 congressional districts across each of the 50 U.S. states. Non-voting delegates from the District of Columbia and four of the five inhabited U.S. territories were also elected. These midterm elections took place nearly halfway through the second term of Democratic President Barack Obama. The winners served in the 114th United States Congress, with seats apportioned among the states based on the 2010 United States census. On Election Day, Republicans had held a House majority since January 2011 as a result of the 2010 elections.

Election ratings 
Several sites and individuals publish ratings of competitive seats. The seats listed below were considered competitive (not "safe" or "solid") by at least one of the rating groups. These ratings are based upon factors such as the strength of the incumbent (if the incumbent is running for re-election), the strength of the candidates, and the partisan history of the district (the Cook Partisan Voting Index is one example of this metric). Each rating describes the likelihood of a given outcome in the election.

Incumbents not running for re-election have parentheses around their names, while incumbents with a caret (^) sought re-election, but were defeated in the primary election. Note that safeness of a district is not necessarily a prediction as to outcome.

Most election ratings use:
 Tossup: no advantage
 Tilt (sometimes used): slight advantage
 Lean: clear advantage
 Likely: strong, but not certain advantage
 Safe: outcome is nearly certain

<div style="overflow-x:auto;>
{| class="wikitable sortable" style="text-align:center"

|- valign=bottom
! District
! CPVI
! Incumbent
! 2012
! Cook(November 3, 2014)
! Daily Kos Elections(November 4, 2014)
! Rothenberg(October 29, 2014)
! Sabato(October 30, 2014)
! Real Clear Politics(November 2, 2014)
! Winner

|-
! 
| style="background:#f66" | 
|  | Don Young (R)
|  | 63.9% R
| style="background:#f66" | 
| style="background:#f99" | 
| style="background:#f66" | 
| style="background:#f99" | 
| style="background:#f99" | 
|  | Young

|-
! 
| style="background:#fcc" | 
|  | Ann Kirkpatrick (D)
|  | 48.8% D
| style="background:#fff" | 
| style="background:#fff" | 
| style="background:#fff" | 
| style="background:#fcc" | 
| style="background:#fff" | 
|  | Kirkpatrick

|-
! 
| style="background:#fcc" | 
|  | Ron Barber (D)
|  | 50.4% D
| style="background:#fff" | 
| style="background:#fff" | 
| style="background:#fff" | 
| style="background:#ccf" | 
| style="background:#fff" | 
|  | McSally

|-
! 
| style="background:#fcc" | 
|  | Kyrsten Sinema (D)
|  | 48.5% D
| style="background:#ccf" | 
| style="background:#ccf" | 
| style="background:#99f" | 
| style="background:#99f" | 
| style="background:#99f" | 
|  | Sinema

|-
! 
| style="background:#f99" | 
|  | (Timothy Griffin) (R)
|  | 55.2% R
| style="background:#fff" | 
| style="background:#fff" | 
| style="background:#fef" | /Tilt R
| style="background:#fcc" | 
| style="background:#fff" | 
|  | Hill

|-
! 
| style="background:#f66" | 
|  | (Tom Cotton) (R)
|  | 59.5% R
| style="background:#fcc" | 
| style="background:#fcc" | 
| style="background:#f99" | 
| style="background:#fcc" | 
| style="background:#fcc" | 
|  | Westerman

|-
! 
| style="background:#ccf" | 
|  | John Garamendi (D)
|  | 53.7% D
| style="background:#99f" | 
| style="background:#99f" | 
| style="background:#66f" | 
| style="background:#66f" | 
| style="background:#99f" | 
|  | Garamendi

|-
! 
| 
|  | Ami Bera (D)
|  | 51.1% D
| style="background:#fff" | 
| style="background:#fff" | 
| style="background:#fff" | 
| style="background:#fcc" | 
| style="background:#fff" | 
|  | Bera

|-
! 
| style="background:#99f" | 
|  | Jerry McNerney (D)
|  | 54.1% D
| style="background:#66f" | 
| style="background:#66f" | 
| style="background:#66f" | 
| style="background:#66f" | 
| style="background:#99f" | 
|  | McNerney

|-
! 
| style="background:#ccf" | 
|  | David Valadao (R)
|  | 59.9% R
| style="background:#fcc" | 
| style="background:#fcc" | 
| style="background:#f99" | 
| style="background:#f99" | 
| style="background:#fcc" | 
|  | Valadao

|-
! 
| style="background:#ccf" | 
|  | Lois Capps (D)
|  | 54.8% D
| style="background:#99f" | 
| style="background:#99f" | 
| style="background:#99f" | 
| style="background:#99f" | 
| style="background:#99f" | 
|  | Capps

|-
! 
| style="background:#ccf" | 
|  | Julia Brownley (D)
|  | 51.7% D
| style="background:#fff" | 
| style="background:#fff" | 
| style="background:#ccf" | 
| style="background:#ccf" | 
| style="background:#fff" | 
|  | Brownley

|-
! 
| style="background:#99f" | 
|  | (Gary Miller) (R)
|  | 55.2% R
| style="background:#ccf" | 
| style="background:#ccf" | 
| style="background:#ccf" | 
| style="background:#ccf" | 
| style="background:#ccf" | 
|  | Aguilar

|-
! 
| style="background:#fcc" | 
|  | Raul Ruiz (D)
|  | 51.4% D
| style="background:#ccf" | 
| style="background:#ccf" | 
| style="background:#66f" | 
| style="background:#ccf" | 
| style="background:#ccf" | 
|  | Ruiz

|-
! 
| style="background:#ccf" | 
|  | Scott Peters (D)
|  | 50.2% D
| style="background:#fff" | 
| style="background:#fff" | 
| style="background:#fff" | 
| style="background:#ccf" | 
| style="background:#fff" | 
|  | Peters

|-
! 
| style="background:#ccf" | 
|  | Mike Coffman (R)
|  | 48.7% R
| style="background:#fcc" | 
| style="background:#fef" | /Tilt R
| style="background:#fef" | /Tilt R
| style="background:#fcc" | 
| style="background:#fff" | 
|  | Coffman

|-
! 
| style="background:#ccf" | 
|  | Elizabeth Esty (D)
|  | 51.5% D
| style="background:#99f" | 
| style="background:#99f" | 
| style="background:#66f" | 
| style="background:#99f" | 
| style="background:#99f" | 
|  | Esty

|-
! 
| style="background:#f99" | 
|  | Steve Southerland (R)
|  | 52.7% R
| style="background:#fff" | 
| style="background:#fff" | 
| style="background:#fff" | 
| style="background:#ccf" | 
| style="background:#fff" | 
|  | Graham

|-
! 
| style="background:#fcc" | 
|  | Patrick Murphy (D)
|  | 50.3% D
| style="background:#99f" | 
| style="background:#ccf" | 
| style="background:#66f" | 
| style="background:#99f" | 
| style="background:#ccf" | 
|  | Murphy

|-
! 
| style="background:#fcc" | 
|  | Joe Garcia (D)
|  | 53.6% D
| style="background:#fff" | 
| style="background:#fff" | 
| style="background:#fef" | /Tilt R
| style="background:#fcc" | 
| style="background:#fff" | 
|  | Curbelo

|-
! 
| style="background:#f99" | 
|  | John Barrow (D)
|  | 53.7% D
| style="background:#fff" | 
| style="background:#fff" | 
| style="background:#ccf" | 
| style="background:#ccf" | 
| style="background:#fff" | 
|  | Allen

|-
! 
| style="background:#66f" | 
|  | (Colleen Hanabusa) (D)
|  | 54.6% D
| style="background:#ccf" | 
| style="background:#ccf" | 
| style="background:#ccf" | 
| style="background:#ccf" | 
| style="background:#fff" | 
|  | Takai

|-
! 
| style="background:#99f" | 
|  | Tammy Duckworth (D)
|  | 54.7% D
| style="background:#99f" | 
| style="background:#66f" | 
| style="background:#66f" | 
| style="background:#66f" | 
| style="background:#66f" | 
|  | Duckworth

|-
! 
| style="background:#99f" | 
|  | Brad Schneider (D)
|  | 50.5% D
| style="background:#fff" | 
| style="background:#fff" | 
| style="background:#fff" | 
| style="background:#fcc" | 
| style="background:#fff" | 
|  | Dold

|-
! 
| style="background:#99f" | 
|  | Bill Foster (D)
|  | 58.1% D
| style="background:#99f" | 
| style="background:#99f" | 
| style="background:#66f" | 
| style="background:#99f" | 
| style="background:#ccf" | 
|  | Foster

|-
! 
| 
|  | Bill Enyart (D)
|  | 51.5% D
| style="background:#fff" | 
| style="background:#fff" | 
| style="background:#fef" | /Tilt R
| style="background:#fcc" | 
| style="background:#fff" | 
|  | Bost

|-
! 
| 
|  | Rodney L. Davis (R)
|  | 46.6% R
| style="background:#f99" | 
| style="background:#f99" | 
| style="background:#f66" | 
| style="background:#f99" | 
| style="background:#fcc" | 
|  | Davis

|-
! 
| style="background:#99f" | 
|  | Cheri Bustos (D)
|  | 53.3% D
| style="background:#ccf" | 
| style="background:#ccf" | 
| style="background:#99f" | 
| style="background:#99f" | 
| style="background:#ccf" | 
|  | Bustos

|-
! 
| style="background:#f99" | 
|  | Jackie Walorski (R)
|  | 49.0% R
| style="background:#f66" | 
| style="background:#f66" | 
| style="background:#f66" | 
| style="background:#f99" | 
| style="background:#f99" | 
|  | Walorski

|-
! 
| style="background:#99f" | 
|  | (Bruce Braley) (D)
|  | 56.9% D
| style="background:#fff" | 
| style="background:#fff" | 
| style="background:#fff" | 
| style="background:#ccf" | 
| style="background:#fff" | 
|  | Blum

|-
! 
| style="background:#ccf" | 
|  | Dave Loebsack (D)
|  | 55.6% D
| style="background:#ccf" | 
| style="background:#ccf" | 
| style="background:#ccf" | 
| style="background:#ccf" | 
| style="background:#ccf" | 
|  | Loebsack

|-
! 
| 
|  | (Tom Latham) (R)
|  | 52.3% R
| style="background:#fff" | 
| style="background:#fff" | 
| style="background:#fff" | 
| style="background:#fcc" | 
| style="background:#fff" | 
|  | Young

|-
! 
| style="background:#f99" | 
|  | Steve King (R)
|  | 53.2% R
| style="background:#f66" | 
| style="background:#f99" | 
| style="background:#f66" | 
| style="background:#f66" | 
| style="background:#f99" | 
|  | King

|-
! 
| style="background:#f99" | 
|  | Lynn Jenkins (R)
|  | 57.0% R
| style="background:#f99" | 
| style="background:#f99" | 
| style="background:#f66" | 
| style="background:#f99" | 
| style="background:#f99" | 
|  | Jenkins

|-
! 
| style="background:#f99" | 
|  | Kevin Yoder (R)
|  | 68.4% R
| style="background:#f99" | 
| style="background:#f66" | 
| style="background:#f66" | 
| style="background:#f99" | 
| style="background:#f99" | 
|  | Yoder

|-
! 
| style="background:#ccf" | 
|  | (Mike Michaud) (D)
|  | 58.1% D
| style="background:#ccf" | 
| style="background:#ccf" | 
| style="background:#ccf" | 
| style="background:#ccf" | 
| style="background:#fff" | 
|  | Poliquin

|-
! 
| style="background:#ccf" | 
|  | John K. Delaney (D)
|  | 58.8% D
| style="background:#99f" | 
| style="background:#99f" | 
| style="background:#66f" | 
| style="background:#66f" | 
| style="background:#99f" | 
|  | Delaney

|-
! 
| style="background:#ccf" | 
|  | John F. Tierney^ (D)
|  | 48.3% D
| style="background:#ccf" | 
| style="background:#eef" | 
| style="background:#eef" | 
| style="background:#ccf" | 
| style="background:#ccf" | 
|  | Moulton

|-
! 
| style="background:#99f" | 
|  | William R. Keating (D)
|  | 58.3% D
| style="background:#99f" | 
| style="background:#99f" | 
| style="background:#99f" | 
| style="background:#99f" | 
| style="background:#ccf" | 
|  | Keating

|-
! 
| style="background:#f99" | 
|  | Dan Benishek (R)
|  | 48.2% R
| style="background:#f99" | 
| style="background:#fcc" | 
| style="background:#f99" | 
| style="background:#f99" | 
| style="background:#fcc" | 
|  | Benishek

|-
! 
| style="background:#f99" | 
|  | (Dave Camp) (R)
|  | 63.1% R
| style="background:#f66" | 
| style="background:#f66" | 
| style="background:#f66" | 
| style="background:#f66" | 
| style="background:#f99" | 
|  | Moolenaar

|-
! 
| style="background:#fcc" | 
|  | Fred Upton (R)
|  | 54.6% R
| style="background:#f99" | 
| style="background:#f99" | 
| style="background:#f66" | 
| style="background:#f66" | 
| style="background:#f66" | 
|  | Upton

|-
! 
| style="background:#fcc" | 
|  | Tim Walberg (R)
|  | 53.3% R
| style="background:#f66" | 
| style="background:#f99" | 
| style="background:#f66" | 
| style="background:#f99" | 
| style="background:#f99" | 
|  | Walberg

|-
! 
| style="background:#fcc" | 
|  | (Mike Rogers) (R)
|  | 58.6% R
| style="background:#f66" | 
| style="background:#f99" | 
| style="background:#f66" | 
| style="background:#f99" | 
| style="background:#f99" | 
|  | Bishop

|-
! 
| style="background:#fcc" | 
|  | Kerry Bentivolio (R)
|  | 50.7% R
| style="background:#f99" | 
| style="background:#f99" | 
| style="background:#f66" | 
| style="background:#f66" | 
| style="background:#f66" | 
|  | Trott

|-
! 
| style="background:#fcc" | 
|  | Tim Walz (D)
|  | 57.6% D
| style="background:#99f" | 
| style="background:#66f" | 
| style="background:#66f" | 
| style="background:#66f" | 
| style="background:#66f" | 
|  | Walz

|-
! 
| style="background:#f99" | 
|  | Collin Peterson (D)
|  | 60.4% D
| style="background:#ccf" | 
| style="background:#fff" | 
| style="background:#ccf" | 
| style="background:#ccf" | 
| style="background:#ccf" | 
|  | Peterson

|-
! 
| style="background:#ccf" | 
|  | Rick Nolan (D)
|  | 54.5% D
| style="background:#fff" | 
| style="background:#fff" | 
| style="background:#fff" | 
| style="background:#fcc" | 
| style="background:#fff" | 
|  | Nolan

|-
! 
| style="background:#f99" | 
|  | (Steve Daines) (R)
|  | 53.2% R
| style="background:#f99" | 
| style="background:#f66" | 
| style="background:#f66" | 
| style="background:#f99" | 
| style="background:#f99" | 
|  | Zinke

|-
! 
| style="background:#fcc" | 
|  | Lee Terry (R)
|  | 51.2% R
| style="background:#fff" | 
| style="background:#eef" | 
| style="background:#eef" | 
| style="background:#ccf" | 
| style="background:#fff" | 
|  | Ashford

|-
! 
| 
|  | Joe Heck (R)
|  | 50.4% R
| style="background:#f99" | 
| style="background:#f66" | 
| style="background:#f66" | 
| style="background:#f66" | 
| style="background:#f99" | 
|  | Heck

|-
! 
| style="background:#ccf" | 
|  | Steven Horsford (D)
|  | 50.1% D
| style="background:#ccf" | 
| style="background:#eef" | 
| style="background:#99f" | 
| style="background:#ccf" | 
| style="background:#ccf" | 
|  | Hardy

|-
! 
| style="background:#fcc" | 
|  | Carol Shea-Porter (D)
|  | 49.7% D
| style="background:#fff" | 
| style="background:#fff" | 
| style="background:#eef" | 
| style="background:#fcc" | 
| style="background:#fff" | 
|  | Guinta

|-
! 
| style="background:#ccf" | 
|  | Ann McLane Kuster (D)
|  | 50.2% D
| style="background:#ccf" | 
| style="background:#ccf" | 
| style="background:#ccf" | 
| style="background:#ccf" | 
| style="background:#fff" | 
|  | Kuster

|-
! 
| style="background:#fcc" | 
|  | (Jon Runyan) (R)
|  | 53.8% R
| style="background:#fcc" | 
| style="background:#fcc" | 
| style="background:#fcc" | 
| style="background:#fcc" | 
| style="background:#fcc" | 
|  | MacArthur

|-
! 
| style="background:#fcc" | 
|  | Scott Garrett (R)
|  | 55.5% R
| style="background:#f99" | 
| style="background:#f66" | 
| style="background:#f66" | 
| style="background:#f66" | 
| style="background:#f99" | 
|  | Garrett

|-
! 
| style="background:#fcc" | 
|  | Tim Bishop (D)
|  | 52.2% D
| style="background:#fff" | 
| style="background:#fff" | 
| style="background:#fff" | 
| style="background:#fcc" | 
| style="background:#fff" | 
|  | Zeldin

|-
! 
| style="background:#ccf" | 
|  | (Carolyn McCarthy) (D)
|  | 61.8% D
| style="background:#99f" | 
| style="background:#99f" | 
| style="background:#66f" | 
| style="background:#66f" | 
| style="background:#99f" | 
|  | Rice

|-
! 
| style="background:#fcc" | 
|  | Michael Grimm (R)
|  | 52.8% R
| style="background:#fcc" | 
| style="background:#fcc" | 
| style="background:#fef" | /Tilt R
| style="background:#fcc" | 
| style="background:#fff" | 
|  | Grimm

|-
! 
| 
|  | Sean Patrick Maloney (D)
|  | 51.7% D
| style="background:#fff" | 
| style="background:#ccf" | 
| style="background:#eef" | 
| style="background:#ccf" | 
| style="background:#ccf" | 
|  | Maloney

|-
! 
| style="background:#ccf" | 
|  | Chris Gibson (R)
|  | 53.4% R
| style="background:#f99" | 
| style="background:#f99" | 
| style="background:#f66" | 
| style="background:#f99" | 
| style="background:#f99" | 
|  | Gibson

|-
! 
| 
|  | (Bill Owens) (D)
|  | 50.2% D
| style="background:#f99" | 
| style="background:#f99" | 
| style="background:#f66" | 
| style="background:#f99" | 
| style="background:#fcc" | 
|  | Stefanik

|-
! 
| style="background:#fcc" | 
|  | Tom Reed (R)
|  | 52.1% R
| style="background:#f66" | 
| style="background:#f99" | 
| style="background:#f66" | 
| style="background:#f99" | 
| style="background:#f99" | 
|  | Reed

|-
! 
| style="background:#99f" | 
|  | Dan Maffei (D)
|  | 48.4% D
| style="background:#fff" | 
| style="background:#fff" | 
| style="background:#eef" | 
| style="background:#ccf" | 
| style="background:#fff" | 
|  | Katko

|-
! 
| style="background:#f66" | 
|  | (Mike McIntyre) (D)
|  | 50.1% D
| style="background:#f99" | 
| style="background:#f66" | 
| style="background:#f66" | 
| style="background:#f66" | 
| style="background:#f66" | 
|  | Rouzer

|-
! 
| style="background:#f66" | 
|  | Kevin Cramer (R)
|  | 54.9% R
| style="background:#f99" | 
| style="background:#f99" | 
| style="background:#f66" | 
| style="background:#f99" | 
| style="background:#f66" | 
|  | Cramer

|-
! 
| style="background:#f99" | 
|  | Bill Johnson (R)
|  | 53.3% R
| style="background:#f66" | 
| style="background:#f66" | 
| style="background:#f66" | 
| style="background:#f66" | 
| style="background:#f99" | 
|  | Johnson

|-
! 
| style="background:#fcc" | 
|  | David Joyce (R)
|  | 54.3% R
| style="background:#f66" | 
| style="background:#f66" | 
| style="background:#f66" | 
| style="background:#f66" | 
| style="background:#f99" | 
|  | Joyce

|-
! 
| style="background:#fcc" | 
|  | (Jim Gerlach) (R)
|  | 57.1% R
| style="background:#f99" | 
| style="background:#f66" | 
| style="background:#f99" | 
| style="background:#f66" | 
| style="background:#f99" | 
|  | Costello

|-
! 
| style="background:#fcc" | 
|  | Pete Gallego (D)
|  | 50.3% D
| style="background:#ccf" | 
| style="background:#ccf" | 
| style="background:#ccf" | 
| style="background:#ccf" | 
| style="background:#ccf" | 
|  | Hurd

|-
! 
| style="background:#f66" | 
|  | (Jim Matheson) (D)
|  | 49.3% D
| style="background:#f99" | 
| style="background:#f99" | 
| style="background:#f66" | 
| style="background:#f99" | 
| style="background:#f66" | 
|  | Love

|-
! 
| style="background:#fcc" | 
|  | (Frank Wolf) (R)
|  | 58.8% R
| style="background:#fcc" | 
| style="background:#fcc" | 
| style="background:#fcc" | 
| style="background:#fcc" | 
| style="background:#fff" | 
|  | Comstock

|-
! 
| style="background:#ccf" | 
|  | Suzan DelBene (D)
|  | 53.6% D
| style="background:#99f" | 
| style="background:#66f" | 
| style="background:#66f" | 
| style="background:#66f" | 
| style="background:#99f" | 
|  | DelBene

|-
! 
| style="background:#f66" | 
|  | (Shelley Moore Capito) (R)
|  | 69.8% R
| style="background:#fff" | 
| style="background:#fcc" | 
| style="background:#fef" | /Tilt R
| style="background:#fcc" | 
| style="background:#fff" | 
|  | Mooney

|-
! 
| style="background:#f66" | 
|  | Nick Rahall (D)
|  | 53.9% D
| style="background:#fff" | 
| style="background:#fef" | /Tilt R
| style="background:#fff" | 
| style="background:#fcc" | 
| style="background:#fff" | 
|  | Jenkins

|-
! 
| style="background:#f99" | 
|  | (Tom Petri) (R)
|  | 62.1% R
| style="background:#f99" | 
| style="background:#f99" | 
| style="background:#f66" | 
| style="background:#f66" | 
| style="background:#f99" | 
|  | Grothman

|-
! 
| style="background:#fcc" | 
|  | Sean Duffy (R)
|  | 56.1% R
| style="background:#f66" | 
| style="background:#f66" | 
| style="background:#f66" | 
| style="background:#f66" | 
| style="background:#f99" | 
|  | Duffy

|- valign=top
! District
! CPVI
! Incumbent
! 2012
! Cook
! Daily Kos Elections
! Rothenberg
! Sabato
! Real Clear Politics
! Winner

Notes

References 

House